Firepower is a military concept rooted in the ability to direct a heavy weight of metal onto the enemy or enemy possession.

Fire power or Firepower may also refer to:

Film and TV
 Firepower (film), a 1979 film starring Sophia Loren, James Coburn, O.J. Simpson, Eli Wallach and Victor Mature
 Firepower, 1993 action film with Chad McQueen and Gary Daniels
 "Firepower", an episode of Discovery Channel series Future Weapons

Books
 Firepower (comics), a Marvel Comics supervillain
Firepower: The Most Spectacular Fraud in Australian History, investigative book by Gerard Ryle into the Firepower fuel pill fraud
 Fire Power (comic book), an Image Comics series by Robert Kirkman and Chris Samnee

Games
 Firepower (pinball), a 1980 pinball game designed by Steve Ritchie and released by Williams
 Fire Power (video game), a tank action game for the Amiga and DOS
 Firepower (computer game), an expansion pack for Microsoft's Combat Flight Simulator 3: Battle for Europe

Music

Albums
Fire Power, a 1978 album by Legs Diamond
Firepower, a 1984 album by Chateaux
 Firepower (Judas Priest album), a 2018 album by Judas Priest

Songs
 "Firepower", a song by Robert Fripp The First Day (David Sylvian and Robert Fripp album) Damage: Live
 "FirePower", a song by Raven from their 1982 album Wiped Out
 "Firepower", a song by Bamboo Mañalac from Bless This Mess (Bamboo Mañalac album)
 "Firepower", a song from Put It On sampled by Datsik
 "Fire Power", a song by American electronic artist Wolfgang Gartner from his 2009 single "Fire Power/Latin Fever"

Other
 Fire power station, a fossil fuel power station
 Firepower – The Royal Artillery Museum, a military museum in Woolwich, London, England
 Chrysler Firepower, a Dodge Viper-based concept car produced under the Chrysler brand
 Firepower International, an Australian fraud case
 Manny Pacquiao vs. Miguel Cotto, a 2009 boxing event